Thakgalo Khanya Leshabela (born 18 September 1999) is a South African soccer player who plays as a midfielder for  club Leicester City.

Born in Soshanguve, South Africa, Leshabela grew up in Northampton, England. He started his career at Leicester City where he signed his first professional contract in January 2019 before making his Premier League debut in March 2021.

Early life
Leshabela was born in the township of Soshanguve, near Pretoria, though his parents were originally from Limpopo. At the age of 2, Leshabela moved from South Africa to Northampton, England. He was educated at Northampton Academy.

Club career
He began his career with the academies of Parklands Tigers and Gregory Celtics, before moving to Leicester City in 2013. He signed a three-and-a-half year professional contract with the club in January 2019. Leshabela made his Premier League debut with Leicester as an 81st-minute substitute during a 5–0 victory against Sheffield United on 14 March 2021. Following his debut, manager Brendan Rodgers praised Leshabela, stating that "he's a young player who has worked very hard", adding that "he has got qualities and he came into the game and showed a nice confidence".

On 19 August 2021, Leshabela joined EFL League One club Shrewsbury Town on a season-long loan. He made his League One debut on 21 August 2021 as a 71st-minute substitute during a 0–3 defeat against Plymouth Argyle. After struggling for game time, manager Steve Cotterill said that Leshabela's loan had been a 'punt' and his position at the club would be reassessed in the January transfer window. On 27 January 2022, his loan spell was terminated.

On 26 July 2022, Leshabela joined EFL League Two club Crewe Alexandra on a six-month loan deal, and made a substitute appearance in Crewe's opening game of the 2022–23 season, a 2–1 victory over Rochdale at Spotland on 30 July 2022. He made his first Crewe start on 9 August 2022, playing in an EFL League Cup first round defeat at Grimsby Town.

International career
Leshabela has represented South Africa at under-20 level, having played at the 2019 Africa U-20 Cup of Nations and the 2019 FIFA U-20 World Cup.

Style of play
Leshabela plays primarily as a winger but can also play as an attacking midfielder. In August 2019, Leicester City manager Brendan Rodgers praised Leshabela, stating that "he's dynamic, he is physical, he has good fitness, a nice touch of the ball and he has an understanding of how to play the game tactically, which is very important."

Career statistics

References

1999 births
Living people
Soccer players from Pretoria
South African soccer players
Association football midfielders
Leicester City F.C. players
Shrewsbury Town F.C. players
Crewe Alexandra F.C. players
English Football League players
Premier League players
South African expatriate soccer players
South African expatriate sportspeople in England
Expatriate footballers in England